An Arduinome is a MIDI controller device that mimics the Monome using the Arduino physical computing platform. The plans for the Arduinome are released under an open source, non-commercial use only license. The Arduinome platform is noted for providing a lower cost alternative to the Monome and allows greater hackability of the interface.

See also
 List of music software

References

External links
 The Arduinome Software on Sourceforge
 FlipMu (Bricktable's) Arduinome building guide — original Arduinome firmware authors

Electronic musical instruments
Experimental musical instruments
Open hardware electronic devices
Open-source music hardware
DIY electronic music hardware
Arduino

fr:Monome
it:Monome